215th Street may refer to:
 215th Street (MVTA station), Minnesota
 215th Street (IRT Broadway – Seventh Avenue Line), New York City Subway